1923 Osiris, provisional designation , is a dark asteroid from the inner regions of the asteroid belt, approximately 13 kilometers in diameter. It was discovered on 24 September 1960, by Ingrid and Cornelis Johannes van Houten at Leiden, on photographic plates taken by Tom Gehrels at Palomar Observatory in the United States. It was named after the Egyptian god Osiris.

Orbit and classification 

Osiris orbits the Sun in the inner main-belt at a distance of 2.3–2.6 AU once every 3 years and 10 months (1,388 days). Its orbit has an eccentricity of 0.06 and an inclination of 5° with respect to the ecliptic. Due to a precovery taken at the discovering observatory in 1953, the body's observation arc is extended by 7 years prior to its official discovery observation.

Palomar–Leiden survey 

The designation P–L stands for Palomar–Leiden, named after Palomar Observatory and Leiden Observatory, which collaborated on the fruitful Palomar–Leiden survey in the 1960s. Gehrels used Palomar's Samuel Oschin telescope (also known as the 48-inch Schmidt Telescope), and shipped the photographic plates to Ingrid and Cornelis Johannes van Houten at Leiden Observatory. The trio are credited with several thousand asteroid discoveries.

Physical characteristics 

In the SMASS classification, Osiris is a carbonaceous C-type asteroid.

According to the survey carried out by NASA's Wide-field Infrared Survey Explorer with its subsequent NEOWISE mission, Osiris measures 13.461 kilometers in diameter and its surface has a low albedo of 0.031. As of 2017, no rotational lightcurve has been obtained.

Naming 

This minor planet was named after Osiris, the Egyptian god of vegetation, of the waxing and waning Moon and of the annual flooding of the Nile. The official naming citation was published by the Minor Planet Center on 1 November 1979.

References

External links 
 Asteroid Lightcurve Database (LCDB), query form (info )
 Dictionary of Minor Planet Names, Google books
 Asteroids and comets rotation curves, CdR – Observatoire de Genève, Raoul Behrend
 Discovery Circumstances: Numbered Minor Planets (1)-(5000) – Minor Planet Center
 
 

001923
Discoveries by Cornelis Johannes van Houten
Discoveries by Ingrid van Houten-Groeneveld
Discoveries by Tom Gehrels
4011
Named minor planets
001923
19600924